Pelēči Parish is an administrative unit of Preiļi Municipality, Latvia and previously the Preiļi District.

Towns, villages and settlements of Pelēči Parish

References 

Parishes of Latvia
Preiļi Municipality